Kiz was a New German Wave band from Reutlingen, Germany. Founded by Joachim Gaiser, Ulrich Herter, Thomas Dörr, Chutichai Indrasen in 1982. Their biggest international hit was "Die Sennerin vom Königsee".
Ulrich Herter has worked with many other bands and musicians - Two of Us, Fools Garden, Camouflage, Sandra Cretu, Hubert Kemmler known as Hubert Kah.

Discography

Singles 

 1982: Die Sennerin vom Königsee
Germany:3, Austria:3, Swiss:3
 1982: Reisefieber
 1982: Mein Herz ist klein
 1983: Reisefieber
 1984: Wo sind meine Alpen

Albums 

 1983: Vom Königsee... In Ferne Länder

German musical groups